The 2018–19 Louisiana–Monroe women's basketball team represents University of Louisiana at Monroe in the 2018–19 NCAA Division I women's basketball season. The Warhawks, led by fifth year head coach Jeff Dow, play their home games at Fant–Ewing Coliseum and were members of the Sun Belt Conference. They finished the season 10–19, 4–14 in Sun Belt play to finish in eleventh place. They failed to qualify for the Sun Belt women's tournament.

On February 13, Jeff Dow will not return next season. He finish at Louisiana–Monroe with a 5-year record of 44–103.

Roster

Schedule

|-
!colspan=9 style=| Non-conference regular season

|-
!colspan=9 style=| Sun Belt regular season

See also
2018–19 Louisiana–Monroe Warhawks men's basketball team

References

External links

Louisiana–Monroe Warhawks women's basketball seasons
Louisiana-Monroe